Ram Chandra Jha (Nepali: राम चन्द्र झा) is a Nepali politician of CPN (Unified Socialist). He is also secretariat member of the party which is the highest level committee in the party. He is also served as member of the 1st Constituent Assembly from Dhanusha-1.

Political life 
In the elections of 2056 BS and 2064 BS, Jha was elected from Dhanusha 1 on behalf of CPN (UML). In the 2070 election, Jha became the Maoist candidate. Jha, had briefly joined Naya Shakti led by Baburam Bhattarai from 2015 to 2017. Again, he returned to the Maoist before the elections. In the 2074 election, the Left Alliance had fielded a candidate in Dhanusha.

After the split in CPN (UML), Jha left the CPN (Maoist Centre) to join Madhav Kumar Nepal led CPN (Unified Socialist). After this, he said that he was finally able to return his home back.

Electoral history

2017 legislative elections

2013 Constituent Assembly election

2008 Constituent Assembly election

1999 legislative elections

1994 legislative elections

References 

Year of birth missing (living people)
Living people
Nepalese politicians
Communist Party of Nepal (Unified Socialist) politicians
People from Dhanusha District
Members of the 1st Nepalese Constituent Assembly
Nepal MPs 1994–1999